The Confessions of Rick James: Memoirs of a Super Freak is a book that funk musician Rick James was working on, before his death on the 6th of August 2004. The book was published in 2007 by Colossus Books. David Ritz, who had been employed by James to work on the book with him, later said that this version did not truly reflect how the musician wanted it published. In 2014, Ritz published his own re-edited version entitled Glow: The Autobiography of Rick James.

References
Goodreads The Confessions of Rick James

2007 non-fiction books
American memoirs
Music autobiographies
Books published posthumously